Fireworks, Should We See It from the Side or the Bottom? may refer to:

 Fireworks, Should We See It from the Side or the Bottom? (1993 film), a Japanese television film by writer/director Shunji Iwai and shown on Fuji TV
 Fireworks, Should We See It from the Side or the Bottom? (2017 film), a 2017 Japanese anime film based on the television film